Budka is a Polish surname. Notable people with this surname include:

 Adrian Budka (born 1980), Polish football player
 Borys Budka (born 1978), Polish politician
 Frank Budka (born 1942), American American football player
 Nykyta Budka (1877–1949), Ukrainian clergyman
 Václav Budka (born 1969), Czech football player